Uracis imbuta, also known by its common name tropical woodskimmer is a species from the genus Uracis. The species was first described by Hermann Burmeister in 1839.

References

Libellulidae
Taxa named by Hermann Burmeister
Insects of the Caribbean